is a multi-purpose dam in Kurihara, Miyagi Prefecture, Japan, completed in 1957.

References 

Dams in Miyagi Prefecture
Dams completed in 1957
Kurihara, Miyagi
Hydroelectric power stations in Japan